The short-billed pigeon (Patagioenas nigrirostris) is a largish pigeon which breeds from southern Mexico south to northwestern Colombia. It is a member of a clade of Patagioenas that contains the smaller and rather plain species with characteristic calls that constitute the subgenus Oenoenas.

It lays one white egg.

It is unpatterned and mainly wine-purple in colour, becoming browner on the belly and more olive-brown on the back. The tail and primary flight feathers are blackish, the bill is black, and the legs and eyes are purple-red. The female is slightly duller and browner than the male, and the juvenile bird has a greyish brown head, neck and breast, with cinnamon scaling on the head and upperparts.

The short-billed pigeon has a complex, loud and high-pitched call ; this is usually uttered singly or at least with considerable pauses between calls. It is normally sighted in pairs as it forages in the tree tops for mistletoe, fruits and berries, but may also be seen on tracks and roadsides seeking grit or small invertebrates.

In southern Central America, this species is replaced at higher altitudes by its close relative, the very similar ruddy pigeon, Patagioenas subvinacea. They can be distinguished by the slower, more complex "song" of the short-billed pigeon.

References

 Stiles, F. Gary & Skutch, Alexander Frank (1989): A guide to the birds of Costa Rica. Comistock, Ithaca.

External links
Short-billed pigeon photo; Article (AOCR)
Short-billed pigeon photo gallery VIREO
Short-billed pigeon videos on the Internet Bird Collection

short-billed pigeon
Birds of Central America
Birds of Mexico
Birds of Belize
Birds of Guatemala
Birds of Honduras
Birds of Nicaragua
Birds of Costa Rica
Birds of Panama
short-billed pigeon
short-billed pigeon